Konz is a city in the Trier-Saarburg district, in Rhineland-Palatinate, Germany. It is situated at the confluence of the rivers Saar and Moselle, approx. 8 km southwest of Trier.

Konz is the seat of the Verbandsgemeinde ("collective municipality") Konz. The following villages are part of the municipality Konz:
Canet 
Filzen 
Hamm 
Karthaus 
Könen 
Krettnach 
Kommlingen 
Niedermennig 
Oberemmel 
Obermennig 
Roscheid
Windah

History
From 18 July 1946 until 6 June 1947 Konz, in its then municipal boundary, formed part of the Saar Protectorate.

Population

Museums 
 Roscheider Hof Open Air Museum

References

External links
 Websites in Konz

Towns in Rhineland-Palatinate
Trier-Saarburg